The 1975 Tournament Players Championship was a golf tournament in Texas on the PGA Tour, held  at Colonial Country Club in Fort Worth. This was the second Tournament Players Championship;  led wire-to-wire and finished three strokes ahead of runner-up Dave Stockton. Defending champion Jack Nicklaus opened with 67 but finished seventeen strokes behind, tied for eighteenth.

The first two Tournament Players Championships were played in late summer; this edition was two weeks after the PGA Championship at Firestone, won by Nicklaus. The next TPC was held just six months later, in south Florida in late February, before the majors.

Venue

This was the only Tournament Players Championship held in Texas; the first was in Georgia in 1974 and it relocated to Florida in 1976. Colonial Country Club has hosted an annual event on the PGA Tour since 1946 and was the site of the U.S. Open in 1941.

Past champions in the field 

Source:

Round summaries

First round
Thursday, August 21, 1975

Source:

Second round
Friday, August 22, 1975
Saturday, August 23, 1975

Source:

Third round
Saturday, August 23, 1975

Source:

Final round
Sunday, August 24, 1975

Source:

References

External links
The Players Championship website

1975
1975 in golf
1975 in American sports
1975 in sports in Texas
August 1975 sports events in the United States